The Archiv Orientální (ArOr) is a triannual peer-reviewed academic journal covering African, Asian, and Near Eastern studies. It is currently published by the Oriental Institute of the Czech Academy of Sciences.

The current editor-in-chief is Táňa Dluhošová, a research fellow at the Czech Academy of Sciences.

History
Archiv Orientální was founded by the Oriental Institute of the Czech Academy of Sciences in 1929 by Bedrich Hrozný with an endowment from the country's president, Tomáš Garrigue Masaryk, on the occasion of his seventieth birthday anniversary.

Abstracting and indexing 
Archiv Orientální is abstracted and indexed in the Arts and Humanities Citation Index, ERIH PLUS, and Scopus.

References

External links
 

Publications established in 1929
Multilingual journals
Triannual journals
Area studies journals
Czech Academy of Sciences
John Benjamins academic journals
1929 establishments in Czechoslovakia